A ground station, Earth station, or Earth terminal is a terrestrial radio station designed for extraplanetary telecommunication with spacecraft (constituting part of the ground segment of the spacecraft system), or reception of radio waves from astronomical radio sources. Ground stations may be located either on the surface of the Earth, or in its atmosphere. Earth stations communicate with spacecraft by transmitting and receiving radio waves in the super high frequency (SHF) or extremely high frequency (EHF) bands (e.g. microwaves). When a ground station successfully transmits radio waves to a spacecraft (or vice versa), it establishes a telecommunications link. A principal telecommunications device of the ground station is the parabolic antenna.

Ground stations may have either a fixed or itinerant position. Article 1 § III of the International Telecommunication Union (ITU) Radio Regulations describes various types of stationary and mobile ground stations, and their interrelationships.

Specialized satellite Earth stations are used to telecommunicate with satellites — chiefly communications satellites. Other ground stations communicate with crewed space stations or uncrewed space probes. A ground station that primarily receives telemetry data, or that follows space missions, or satellites not in geostationary orbit, is called a ground tracking station, or space tracking station, or simply a tracking station.

When a spacecraft or satellite is within a ground station's line of sight, the station is said to have a view of the spacecraft (see pass). It is possible for a spacecraft to communicate with more than one ground station at a time. A pair of ground stations are said to have a spacecraft in mutual view when the stations share simultaneous, unobstructed, line-of-sight contact with the spacecraft.

Telecommunications port 
A telecommunications port — or, more commonly, teleport — is a satellite ground station that functions as a hub connecting a satellite or geocentric orbital network with a terrestrial telecommunications network, such as the Internet.

Teleports may provide various broadcasting services among other telecommunications functions, such as uploading computer programs or issuing commands over an uplink to a satellite.

In May 1984, the Dallas/Fort Worth Teleport became the first American teleport to commence operation.

Earth terminal complexes 

In Federal Standard 1037C, the United States General Services Administration defined an Earth terminal complex as the assemblage of equipment and facilities necessary to integrate an Earth terminal (ground station) into a telecommunications network. FS-1037C has since been subsumed by the ATIS Telecom Glossary, which is maintained by the Alliance for Telecommunications Industry Solutions (ATIS), an international, business-oriented, non-governmental organization. The Telecommunications Industry Association also acknowledges this definition.

Satellite communications standards 
The ITU Radiocommunication Sector (ITU-R), a division of the International Telecommunication Union, codifies international standards agreed-upon through multinational discourse. From 1927 to 1932, standards and regulations now governed by the ITU-R were administered by the International Consultative Committee for Radio.

In addition to the body of standards defined by the ITU-R, each major satellite operator provides technical requirements and standards that ground stations must meet in order to communicate with the operator's satellites. For example, Intelsat publishes the Intelsat Earth Station Standards (IESS) which, among other things, classifies ground stations by the capabilities of their parabolic antennas, and pre-approves certain antenna models. Eutelsat publishes similar standards and requirements, such as the Eutelsat Earth Station Standards (EESS).

The Teleport (originally called a Telecommunications Satellite Park) innovation was conceived and developed by Joseph Milano in 1976 as part of a National Research Council study entitled, ''Telecommunications for Metropolitan Areas: Near-Term Needs and Opportunities".

Major Earth stations and Earth terminal complexes

See also

References

External links 
 UplinkStation.com, a corporate directory of commercial teleports, satellite television operators, et al.
 World Teleport Association

 
Satellite broadcasting
Telecommunications infrastructure